The Great Seal of the State of Ohio is the official insignia of the U.S. state of Ohio. All governmental offices, agencies, and courts in Ohio use variations of the state seal. Its primary feature is a circular coat of arms that depicts a sunrise in Chillicothe, Ohio's first capital, along with symbols of the state's origins. The seal sometimes appears with the state motto, "With God, All Things Are Possible".

Shortly after its establishment in 1803, the state adopted a seal based on a sketch by Secretary of State William Creighton, Jr. Except for a brief period during the 1860s, the layout and details were left largely unregulated until a standardized coat of arms, based on the original design, was introduced in 1967. The coat of arms was modified most recently in 1996.

Each of Ohio's 88 counties maintains its own official seal based on the state seal.

Design

The design of the Great Seal of the State of Ohio is defined in Ohio Revised Code section 5.10:

The coat of arms is defined in section 5.04:

The hills shown in the seal are managed by the Department of Natural Resources as Great Seal State Park.

History
Ohio's state seal has been redesigned at least ten times in the state's history. From 1805 to 1866, the seal's design was left unspecified, a situation unique among the states.

Territorial seal

Before Ohio's statehood, the territorial government of the Northwest Territory had its own seal. The United States Congress passed legislation on May 8, 1792, that directed the U.S. Secretary of State to "provide proper seals for the several and respective public offices in the [Northwest] Territories". A seal was created by the State Department to be used on official papers of the territory. The original seal was maintained by Governor Arthur St. Clair. Its first recorded use was in a proclamation made on July 26, 1788. The seal bears a Latin inscription, "He has planted one better than the one fallen," commemorating the decline of wilderness to make way for civilization.

Rising sun
The first Constitution of Ohio, adopted on November 29, 1802, and effective March 1, 1803, provided for a state seal but left the details unspecified:

The first Secretary of State, William Creighton, Jr., initially used his personal seal on official documents.

On March 25, 1803, the General Assembly passed an act concerning the duties of the Secretary of State, introducing the first of many designs for the state seal, based on a sketch by Creighton:

The design was traditionally said to depict the view from U.S. Senator Thomas Worthington's Chillicothe-area estate, Belle View: in 1803, Creighton emerged from an all-night meeting at the estate and saw "the rising sun of the new state" just beyond Mount Logan. Creighton and Worthington both belonged to the "Chillicothe Junto" that dominated early state politics. However, most historians regard the story to be apocryphal, noting that the sun, mountains, and agricultural implements were common in seals of that era. Regardless, the present seal does represent the view from Worthington's estate, now known as Adena, as a matter of law.

The physical seal of 1803 followed the adopted design loosely: from behind a full mountain range rose a sun with eyes.

Deregulation

On February 19, 1805, the 1803 statute was replaced with identical wording, except for the omission of a design for the great seal. The original state seal had long since fallen out of use. Despite the 1805 act being itself repealed on January 31, 1831, no replacement design was specified. Legislators neglected to address the issue even after the Constitution of 1851 left intact the constitutional requirement for a design.

In the meantime, a wide array of designs emerged, particularly on court seals. Common embellishments included a plow and recumbent sheath of wheat, a range of mountains instead of a single peak (as in the Creighton seal), and an "ark" (a broad horn flatboat with a roof) floating on a river (understood to be the Ohio River, quite a distance from Chillicothe). The 1847 seal depicted in the Statehouse rotunda skylight substitutes the Ohio with a canal, replete with a canal boat. In an 1860s version, the arrows levitate among the clouds. Besides artistic liberty, some seals reflected confusion over the state's founding year, which was popularly believed to be 1802, the year the original constitution was adopted.

Fleeting empire

In 1865, Secretary of State William Henry Smith issued a report on the need to reign in the seal's design. Though appreciative of the symbolism behind the 1803 design, he found the state's  seal to compare unfavorably to other states' larger, more ornate seals, which also featured mottoes and obverse designs. On April 6, 1866, a Republican General Assembly responded, calling for an elaborate coat of arms:

Governor Jacob Dolson Cox issued a proclamation on November 5, 1866, that describes and bears the seal adopted that year.

The Republicans' new motto was problematic, as it ironically recalled states' rights just after the Civil War. Moreover, the increased size, intricate design, and additional seals more than exhausted the $1,000 that had been appropriated to the Secretary of State. An even larger budget overrun would have resulted from an amendment on April 16, 1867.

On May 9, 1868, a newly elected Democratic General Assembly reverted to the 1803 coat of arms and formalized the depiction of a mountain range, present since Creighton's seal. The river remained in contemporary depictions.

Despite the about-face, the 1866 device persisted in various capacities for decades. To the dismay of one historian, the Governor, Secretary of State, and Supreme Court all continued to seal documents with the 1866 device into the 1880s. The State Printer also published books featuring the old seal and motto into the 1900s. In 1889, stained glass seals of 42 states then in existence, including the 1866 Ohio seal, were hung in the Superior Court of San Diego County, California.

Standardization

On December 15, 1967, the coat of arms received a substantial revision. Cincinnati-based interior decorator Robert Greiwe had been commissioned to paint the Great Seal on the dropped ceiling of the Ohio Statehouse rotunda. His uncertainty over which version to paint led State Representatives Ralph B. Kohnen and Myrl Shoemaker to sponsor 107 HB 164, which standardized a specific design throughout state government. The river was reintroduced to the coat of arms, while seventeen distinct rays of sunlight extended to the perimeter of the coat of arms. Now the scene officially depicted the view from Adena. A reference image was for the first time included in the statute:

Under the new legislation, the Governor was given authorization to regulate the seal's use. All new seals acquired after January 1, 1969, were required to bear the new design, and the requirement was extended to county and municipal governments for the first time. Many cities had already adopted seals that bore no relation to the state seal, but they were exempted under a grandfather clause. Though the physical Great Seal was also exempted, the Governor's office eventually replaced it with one that conformed to the new design.

The latest modification, on November 20, 1996, reduced the number of rays from 17 to 13, "to represent the thirteen original colonies shining over the first state in the northwest territory". The reference image was also modified to include a small dot at the interior end of each ray. The bill's sponsor, Senator Roy Ray, argued that the number 17 was already present in the bundle of arrows. State agencies were given a deadline of March 1, 2003 the state bicentennial to update the seal on all publications. There were unsuccessful attempts in 1997, 1999, 2003, and 2011 to add the Wright Flyer to the seal.

Usage

Section 5.10 of the Ohio Revised Code requires the seals of all "state, county, and municipal agencies, divisions, boards and commissions" to bear the state coat of arms. It also specifies the exact wording of the text surrounding the coat of arms of various courts and statewide elected offices. Notaries public are also required to incorporate the state coat of arms in their seals. Various state agencies, such as the Departments of Transportation and Veterans Services, along with many cities, have developed more distinctive emblems and logos to complement their seals.

The state coat of arms appears in the center of the flag of the Governor of Ohio. This design was adopted unofficially in 1905 and officially in 1945. Previously, in 1860, state militia officials unsuccessfully proposed a state flag consisting of the seal upon a white field.

From 2004 to 2010, the state's official coat of arms served as a backdrop for the Bureau of Motor Vehicles' "Sunburst" license plate design, which was issued over a longer period than any other design since the 1980s. Since 2021, the full-color Artist's Version also appears in the background of the "Sunrise in Ohio" license plate design.

Variations

See also 

List of Ohio state symbols
Seal of Cincinnati

References

External links

 Section 5.04 of the Ohio Revised Code (Lawriter) – defines the state coat of arms
 Graphical version of §5.04
 Section 5.10 of the Ohio Revised Code (Lawriter) – defines the state seal

Ohio
Symbols of Ohio
Ohio
Ohio
Ohio
Ohio
Ohio
Symbols introduced in 1967
1967 establishments in Ohio